Yanji Chaoyangchuan International Airport  is an airport serving the city of Yanji in Jilin province of Northeast China.

Airlines and destinations

See also
List of airports in China

References

Airports in Jilin
Buildings and structures in Yanbian